An electric shock is a physiological reaction caused by electric current.

Electric Shock may also refer to:
Electric Shock (EP), a 2012 extended play by f(x)
"Electric Shock" (song), a song from the EP
Electric shock baton, a larger baton-style
Electric shock drowning, a death that happens when swimmers expose to electric currents in water
Electric shock therapy, a psychiatric treatment

See also
Electroshock (disambiguation)